is a Japanese women's professional shogi player ranked 3-dan.
 and  titles.

Early life
Katō was born in Makinohara, Shizuoka Prefecture on October 6, 1993. She started playing shogi when she was about five years old. She started taking shogi lessons and was traveling outside of Shizuoka Prefecture to play in shogi tournaments by the time she was a third-grade elementary school student, and won a national shogi championship when she was a fifth-grade elementary school student.

Apprentice shogi professional
Katō entered the Japan Shogi Association's apprentice school at the rank of 6-kyū as a student of shogi professional  in 2006 when she was eleven years old. She was promoted to the rank of apprentice professional 1-kyū in 2011 and then apprentice professional 1-dan in May 2014, becoming just the third woman to achieve that rank after Kana Satomi and Tomoka Nishiyama.

In March 2019, Katō decided to leave the apprentice school and petitioned the JSA to become a women's professional shogi player instead. In consideration of her past success in women's professional shogi tournaments, the JSA decided to award Katō the rank of 3-dan instead of her last rank as an apprentice professional which is the common practice for women apprentice professionals ranked 2-kyū or higher.

Women's shogi professional
In November 2021, Katō won the 3rd  title (SeptemberNovember 2021) by defeating the defending champion Kana Satomi 3 games to 2. Katō, however, was unable to successfully defend her Seirei title the following year, losing a rematch against Satomi 3 games to none in the 4th Seirei Title Match (JulyAugust 2022). The pair faced each other again in major title match later in 2022 when Katō challenged Satomi for the 12th Women's Oza title (October December 2022). Satomi successfully defended her Women's Ōza title 3 games to 2.

Promotion history
Katō's promotion history is as follows.

 3-dan: April 1, 2019

Note: All ranks are women's professional ranks.

Major titles
Katō has appeared in women's major title matches twenty times and has won a total of nine titles.

References

External links
ShogiHub: Professional Player Info · Kato, Momoko
: Official Twitter account 
Reiwa Shogi Schoo: Shogi school operated by Katō 

Japanese shogi players
Living people
Women's professional shogi players
Queen (shogi)
Women's Ōza
Seirei title holders
Professional shogi players from Shizuoka Prefecture
1993 births